Model N, Inc. is a public American software company founded in 1999 and headquartered in San Mateo, California.  The name "Model N" refers to "model next", as in 'the next big thing'.

History
In 2004, the company added a Medicaid Claims Processing application to its Revenue Management Suite main product.

In the spring of 2006, Model N completed an acquisition of Azerity, a software company that focused on pricing and quoting practices for the high tech industry. In early 2012, Model N acquired LeapFrogRX, an analytics company based in Waltham, Massachusetts.

Venture capital firm Accel-KKR backed the initial public offering.

Corporate governance

In May 2018, Jason Blessing was announced as Model N's president and chief executive officer (CEO).

References

Software companies based in California
Software companies established in 1999
Companies based in Redwood City, California
Software companies of the United States
1999 establishments in California